Alexander Liddle Farmhouse is a historic home located at Duanesburg in Schenectady County, New York. It was built about 1850 by noted master carpenter Alexander Delos "Boss" Jones.  It is a two-story, asymmetrical "T" shaped frame farmhouse in the Greek Revival style. It has a gable roof, clapboard siding, and  features a wide entablature, pronounced cornice returns, and broad corner pilasters. Two one story wings flank the main block. Also on the property are a contributing barn and garage.

The property was covered in a study of Boss Jones TR

It was listed on the National Register of Historic Places in 1984.

References

Houses on the National Register of Historic Places in New York (state)
Greek Revival houses in New York (state)
Houses completed in 1850
Houses in Schenectady County, New York
National Register of Historic Places in Schenectady County, New York